

England

Head Coach: Clive Woodward

 Neil Back
 Kyran Bracken
 Phil Christophers
 Ben Cohen
 Lawrence Dallaglio
 Matt Dawson
 Andy Gomarsall
 Paul Grayson
 Will Greenwood
 Danny Grewcock
 Richard Hill
 Charlie Hodgson
 Martin Johnson (c.)
 Ben Kay
 Jason Leonard
 Josh Lewsey
 Dan Luger
 Lewis Moody
 Robbie Morris
 Mark Regan
 Jason Robinson
 Graham Rowntree
 Alex Sanderson
 Simon Shaw
 James Simpson-Daniel
 Ollie Smith
 Steve Thompson
 Mike Tindall
 Nick Walshe
 Dorian West
 Julian White
 Jonny Wilkinson (c.)*
 Trevor Woodman
 Joe Worsley
 Mike Worsley

*captain in the third game

France

Head Coach: Bernard Laporte

 David Auradou
 Mathieu Barrau
 Serge Betsen
 Olivier Brouzet
 Christian Califano
 Thomas Castaignède
 Sébastien Chabal
 Vincent Clerc
 Jean-Jacques Crenca
 Jean-Baptiste Élissalde
 Fabien Galthié (c.)*
 Xavier Garbajosa
 François Gelez
 Imanol Harinordoquy
 Raphaël Ibañez
 Olivier Magne
 Sylvain Marconnet
 Gérald Merceron
 Frédéric Michalak
 Olivier Milloud
 Fabien Pelous (c.)**
 Clément Poitrenaud
 Aurélien Rougerie
 Jean-Baptiste Rué
 Patrick Tabacco
 Damien Traille
 Dimitri Yachvili

*captain in the first two games
**captain in the third, fourth and fifth games

Ireland

Head Coach: Eddie O'Sullivan

 Justin Bishop
 Paul Burke
 Shane Byrne
 Reggie Corrigan
 Victor Costello
 Leo Cullen
 Girvan Dempsey
 Guy Easterby
 Justin Fitzpatrick
 Anthony Foley
 Keith Gleeson
 John Hayes
 Rob Henderson
 Denis Hickie
 Marcus Horan
 Shane Horgan
 David Humphreys
 John Kelly
 Gary Longwell
 Kevin Maggs
 Eric Miller
 Geordan Murphy
 Donncha O'Callaghan
 Paul O'Connell
 Brian O'Driscoll (c.)
 Ronan O'Gara
 Malcolm O'Kelly
 Alan Quinlan
 Frankie Sheahan
 Peter Stringer

Italy

Head Coach: John Kirwan

 Mauro Bergamasco
 Mirco Bergamasco
 Cristian Bezzi
 Marco Bortolami
 Martin Castrogiovanni
 Denis Dallan
 Giampiero de Carli
 Andrea de Rossi
 Santiago Dellapè
 Diego Dominguez
 Carlo Festuccia
 Mark Giacheri
 Andrea Lo Cicero
 Ramiro Martínez
 Andrea Masi
 Matteo Mazzantini
 Nicola Mazzucato
 Andrea Moretti
 Fabio Ongaro
 Scott Palmer
 Gert Peens
 Aaron Persico
 Salvatore Perugini
 Ramiro Pez
 Matthew Phillips
 Juan Manuel Queirolo
 Giovanni Raineri
 Cristian Stoica
 Alessandro Troncon (c.)
 Paolo Vaccari

Scotland

Head Coach: Ian McGeechan

 Ross Beattie
 Mike Blair
 Gordon Bulloch
 Andy Craig
 Bruce Douglas
 Stuart Grimes
 Nathan Hines
 Gavin Kerr
 Brendan Laney
 Martin Leslie
 Kenny Logan
 James McLaren
 Glenn Metcalfe
 Andrew Mower
 Scott Murray
 Chris Paterson
 Jon Petrie
 Bryan Redpath (c.)
 Gordon Ross
 Robbie Russell
 Steve Scott
 Tom Smith
 Simon Taylor
 Gregor Townsend
 Kevin Utterson
 Jason White

Wales

Head Coach: Steve Hansen

 Colin Charvis (c.)
 Gareth Cooper
 Leigh Davies
 Mefin Davies
 Ben Evans
 Iestyn Harris
 Jonathan Humphreys
 Gethin Jenkins
 Dafydd Jones
 Mark Jones
 Stephen Jones
 Gareth Llewellyn
 Martyn Madden
 Craig Morgan
 Kevin Morgan
 Michael Owen
 Dwayne Peel
 Tom Shanklin
 Robert Sidoli
 Ceri Sweeney
 Mark Taylor
 Gareth Thomas
 Gavin Thomas
 Iestyn Thomas
 Matthew Watkins
 Gareth Williams
 Martyn Williams (c.)*
 Rhys Williams
 Steve Williams

*captain in the last game

External links

2003
2003 Six Nations Championship